The 2018 Tulsa Golden Hurricane football team represented the University of Tulsa in the 2018 NCAA Division I FBS football season. The Golden Hurricane played their home games at the Skelly Field at H. A. Chapman Stadium in Tulsa, Oklahoma, and competed in the West Division of the American Athletic Conference. They were led by fourth-year head coach Philip Montgomery. They finished the season 3–9, 2–6 in American Athletic play to finish in a tie for fifth placein the West Division.

Previous season
The Golden Hurricane finished the 2017 season 2–10, 1–7 in AAC play to finish in last place in the West Division.

Preseason

Award watch lists
Listed in the order that they were released

AAC media poll
The AAC media poll was released on July 24, 2018, with the Golden Hurricane predicted to finish in last place in the AAC West Division.

Schedule

Game summaries

Central Arkansas

at Texas

Arkansas State

at Temple

at Houston

South Florida

at Arkansas

Tulane

UConn

at Memphis

at Navy

SMU

Roster

References

Tulsa
Tulsa Golden Hurricane football seasons
Tulsa Golden Hurricane football